The 2019–20 season covers the period from 1 July 2019 to 27 August 2019. It was Bury's 135th season since the club was founded in 1885, and their first back in League One following promotion from EFL League Two in the 2018–19 season. Bury were expelled from the EFL on 27 August 2019, bringing their season to a premature end.

Pre-season
The Shakers announced a pre-season friendly against Blackburn Rovers.

Competitions

Matches

League table

On Thursday, 20 June 2019, the EFL League One fixtures were announced.

Bury were expelled from the English Football League on 27 August 2019 after failing to satisfy the criteria provided within their notice of withdrawal from the EFL, by a deadline of 5PM BST on this date. The club failed to fulfil any of their League One fixtures in 2019-20 due to their financial crisis, and consequently upon their expulsion, League One will consist of 23 teams for the upcoming season, with three teams being relegated instead of the usual four.

Matches

EFL Cup

FA Cup
Bury were expelled from the FA Cup before the first round draw was made. Chichester City were given a bye to the second round as a result of Bury being removed from the competition.

Transfers

Transfers out

References

Bury
Bury F.C. seasons